Podolia Eyalet was an eyalet of the Ottoman Empire. Its capital was Kamianets-Podilskyi.

History

In 1672, the Ottoman army, led by Sultan Mehmed IV, captured Kamaniçe after a short siege. The Treaty of Buchach confirmed Ottoman control of the city, which became the centre of a new eyalet. The treaty was repudiated by the Polish Diet, and war broke out anew.

The Polish campaign proved unsuccessful, and the truce of Żurawno (1676) left Podolia within Ottoman borders. Another Polish-Ottoman war broke out again in 1683. For the next 16 years, Ottoman rule in Podolia generally was limited to the blockaded fortress of Kamianets, held by a garrison of 6,000 soldiers. The other garrisons in Podolia, in Bar, Medzhybizh, Jazlivec, and Chortkiv, barely exceeded 100 soldiers each.

According to the Ottoman provincial budget of 1681, 13 million akçe were spent yearly in the eyalet, primarily for soldiers' pay. Of this amount, less than 3% was collected from Podolia itself, the rest was sent from the central treasury. In 1681, the patriarch of Constantinople appointed the Orthodox metropolitan of Kamianets, named Pankratij.

The fortress was returned to Poland as a result of the Treaty of Karlowitz (1699).

Governors

During the 27 years of Ottoman rule, Podolia was administered by nine Ottoman pashas:
 Küstendilli Halil (1672–76; 1677–80),
 Arnavut Ibrahim (1676–77)
 Defterdar Ahmed (1680–82)
 Arnavut Abdurrahman (1682–84)
 Tokatlı Mahmud (1684)
 Bozoklu Mustafa (1685–86)
 Sarı Boşnak Hüseyin (1686–88)
 Yegen Ahmed (1688–89)
 Kahraman Mustafa (1689–99)

See also
Podolia

Administrative divisions
The eyalet was divided into four sanjaks:
 Sanjak of Kamaniçe
 Sanjak of Bar
 Sanjak of Mejibuji
 Sanjak of Yazlofça

References

External links
 Podolia under the Ottoman rule, Eyalet-i Kamaniçe 1672-1699

Ottoman period in Ukraine
Eyalets of the Ottoman Empire in Europe
1672 establishments in the Ottoman Empire
1699 disestablishments in the Ottoman Empire
Podolia